Central office can mean any of the following:

 Telephone exchange
 Class-5 telephone switch
 Headquarters
 Corporate headquarters
 Conservative Campaign Headquarters (Britain), formerly Conservative Central Office